Gemmatimonas aurantiaca is a Gram-negative, aerobic, polyphosphate-accumulating micro-organism. It is a Gram-negative, rod-shaped aerobe, with type strain T-27T (=JCM 11422T =DSM 14586T). It replicates by budding.

References

Further reading
Whitman, William B., et al., eds. Bergey's manual® of systematic bacteriology. Vol. 4. Springer, 2012.

External links

LPSN
Type strain of Gemmatimonas aurantiaca at BacDive -  the Bacterial Diversity Metadatabase

Gemmatimonadota
Bacteria described in 2003